Events in the year 2021 in Guyana.

Incumbents
 President: Irfaan Ali
 Prime Minister: Mark Phillips

Events
Ongoing — COVID-19 pandemic in Guyana
February 3 – Taiwan establishes a trade office in Guyana, much to the chagrin of China.

Deaths
17 January – Ebe Gilkes, jazz pianist and bandleader (born 1930 or 1931).
2 February – Reggie Ford, boxer (born 1953).
26 July – George De Peana, long-distance runner and trade union leader (born 1936).
16 August – Bishwaishwar Ramsaroop, politician (born 1939).
24 December – Joycelynne Loncke, academic (born 1941).

See also
List of years in Guyana

References

 
2020s in Guyana
Years of the 21st century in Guyana
Guyana
Guyana